Snelling & Como is a bus rapid transit station on the A Line in Saint Paul, Minnesota, United States.  The station is located at the intersection of Como Avenue and the off-ramps for  Snelling Avenue (Minnesota State Highway 51). Both station platforms are located far-side of Como Avenue.  The station opened June 11, 2016 with the rest of the A Line.

Bus connections
 Route 3 - U of M - Como Av - Energy Park Dr - Maryland Av
 Route 84 - Snelling - Highland Village - Sibley Plaza
Connections to local bus Route 3 can be made on Como Avenue under the Minnesota State Highway 51 overpass. Southbound Route 3B trips and Route 84 share platforms with the A Line.

Notable places nearby
Minnesota State Fair
Como neighborhood, Saint Paul

References

External links 
 Metro Transit: Snelling & Como Station

Bus stations in Minnesota
Transportation in Saint Paul, Minnesota